Klimkovo is a rural locality (a village) in Kiprevskoye Rural Settlement, Kirzhachsky District, Vladimir Oblast, Russia. The population was 8 as of 2010. There is 1 street.

Geography 
Klimkovo is located on the Shorna River, 27 km northeast of Kirzhach (the district's administrative centre) by road. Truskovo is the nearest rural locality.

References 

Rural localities in Kirzhachsky District